Giovonnae Anderson (formerly Giovonnae Dennis) is an American electrical engineer.

Career 
Anderson studied physics and electrical engineering at the University of California, Davis, earning her bachelor's degree in the former and her master's in the latter. In 1979 she became one of the first African-American women to earn a Ph.D. in electrical engineering, and one of the few at a primarily white institution rather than a historically black institution (HBCU).

Anderson has worked at Hewlett-Packard where she designed microwave test equipment; she is also an advocate for women and people of color in science and engineering. Her business Software Tailoring uses 3D body scans to provide patterns for tailoring and custom clothing design.

References 

American women engineers
African-American women engineers
African-American engineers
American electrical engineers
University of California, Davis alumni
Living people
Hewlett-Packard people
21st-century women engineers
Year of birth missing (living people)
21st-century African-American people
21st-century African-American women